The Independent Tour was a co-headlining tour by American recording artists Kelly Clarkson and Clay Aiken. The tour supported their debut albums,  Thankful (2003) and Measure of a Man (2003). The tour only reached the United States during the winter and spring of 2004. Clarkson and Aiken performed individual shows before joining in a duet for Clarkson's encore. Many critics described the tour as the PG version of the Justified and Stripped Tour in 2003. The tour placed 58th in Pollstar's annual "Top 100 Tours", earning over ten million dollars with 31 shows.

Background
Clarkson announced the tour via her official website on January 7, 2004. She wrote: "hey what's up guys! I have some very exciting news! clay aiken and I have decided to team up and co-headline a US tour together. we’re really pumped about it and can’t wait to see y’all there. we’ll be announcing the exact tour dates soon but for now I wanted to give you guys the scoop first. more info to come. have a super day! God bless kelly :)"

Setlist
{{hidden
| headercss = background: #ccccff; font-size: 100%; width: 59%;
| contentcss = text-align: left; font-size: 100%; width: 75%;
| header = Aiken
| content =
"Kyrie" 
"Perfect Day" 
"I Will Carry You" 
"All About Love" 
"No More Sad Songs" 
"When You Say You Love Me"
"Without You" 
"Invisible"
"Run to Me" 
Medley: "Measure of a Man" / "Fields of Gold" / "Carolina in My Mind" 
"When I Need You"
Encore
"When Doves Cry"
"The Way"
}}
{{hidden
| headercss = background: #ccccff; font-size: 100%; width: 59%;
| contentcss = text-align: left; font-size: 100%; width: 75%;
| header = Clarkson
| content =
"Low"
"What's Up Lonely"
"The Trouble with Love Is"
"Just Missed the Train"
"Some Kind of Miracle"
"Beautiful Disaster"
"Stuff Like That There" 
"Why Haven't I Heard from You" 
"You Thought Wrong"
"The Bounce (The Luv)"
"Timeless"
"Anytime"
"Thankful"
Encore
"Miss Independent"
"A Moment Like This"
"Open Arms"

}}

Tour dates

Festivals and other miscellaneous performances
This concert was a part of the "Spring Break Stampede"
This concert was a part of the "Star of Texas Fair and Rodeo"
Only Clarkson performed at these two events

References

2004 concert tours
Co-headlining concert tours
Kelly Clarkson concert tours